HMCS Toronto was a  that served in the Royal Canadian Navy during the Second World War and as a  from 1953-1956. She was named for Toronto, Ontario. She was later acquired by the Royal Norwegian Navy and renamed Garm and then again in 1965 as HNoMS Valkyrien .

Toronto was ordered 1 February 1943 as Giffard (after Giffard, Quebec) as part of the 1943-1944 River-class building program. She was laid down on 10 May 1943 by Davie Shipbuilding & Repairing Co. Ltd. at Lauzon and launched 18 September 1943. Her name was changed to Toronto and she was commissioned into the RCN on 6 May 1944 with the pennant K538.

Background

The River-class frigate was designed by William Reed of Smith's Dock Company of South Bank-on-Tees. Originally called a "twin-screw corvette", its purpose was to improve on the convoy escort classes in service with the Royal Navy at the time, including the Flower-class corvette. The first orders were placed by the Royal Navy in 1940 and the vessels were named for rivers in the United Kingdom, giving name to the class. In Canada they were named for towns and cities though they kept the same designation. The name "frigate" was suggested by Vice-Admiral Percy Nelles of the Royal Canadian Navy and was adopted later that year.

Improvements over the corvette design included improved accommodation which was markedly better. For underwater targets, the River-class frigate was equipped with a Hedgehog anti-submarine mortar and depth charge rails aft and four side-mounted throwers.

River-class frigates were the first Royal Canadian Navy warships to carry the 147B Sword horizontal fan echo sonar transmitter in addition to the irregular ASDIC. This allowed the ship to maintain contact with targets even while firing unless a target was struck. Improved radar and direction-finding equipment improved the RCN's ability to find and track enemy submarines over the previous classes.

Canada originally ordered the construction of 33 frigates in October 1941. The design was too big for the shipyards on the Great Lakes so all the frigates built in Canada were built in dockyards along the west coast or along the St. Lawrence River. In all Canada ordered the construction of 60 frigates including ten for the Royal Navy that transferred two to the United States Navy.

Service history
It was during this time Toronto saw service in the Battle of the St. Lawrence for which the ship was awarded the Battle Honour "Gulf of St. Lawrence - 1944." Magog suffered significant damage from the attack but managed to stay afloat and Toronto took her in tow. However while towing Magog, the other GNAT, an acoustic German torpedo, detonated in Torontos wake. Toronto handed off the towing duties to  after she recorded a contact and departed to chase it down unsuccessfully. 

Following that she served with Halifax Force as a local escort until May 1945. On 27 November 1945, Toronto was paid off and placed in reserve at Shelburne, Nova Scotia.

This meant a flush-decked appearance aft, with a larger bridge and taller funnel. Her hull forward was strengthened against ice and the quarterdeck was enclosed to contain two Squid anti-submarine mortars. Toronto was recommissioned with pennant number 319 on 26 November 1953 at Lauzon.

The frigate was made a part of the First Canadian Escort Squadron in December 1953. In April 1954, Toronto deployed to Bermuda for anti-submarine training with the British submarine  and the American submarine  before joining the First Canadian Escort Squadron on their training cruise through the Caribbean Sea, making several port visits. In September, the First Canadian Escort Squadron took part in the NATO naval exercise "New Broom II" and in October, the exercise "Morning Mist" before performing a two-month training cruise in the Mediterranean Sea, making several port visits. The squadron returned to Canada on 10 December 1954.

Royal Norwegian Navy
Toronto was paid off by the RCN on 14 April 1956 and transferred to the Royal Norwegian Navy as HMNoS Garm. Garm was purchased outright in 1959 and was employed primarily for fisheries protection duties. She was renamed in 1965 to Valkyrien and re-designated a torpedo boat depot ship. She served in this capacity until she was sold and scrapped by the Royal Norwegian Navy in 1977.

See also
 List of ships of the Canadian Navy

References

Citations

Sources

External links

River-class frigates of the Royal Canadian Navy
1943 ships
Ships built in Quebec